Sir Thomas Henderson (15 July 1874 – 3 May 1951) was a Scottish Liberal Party politician and businessman.

Background
He was the son of James Henderson JP of Hawick. He was educated at Hawick and at Blairlodge Academy, Stirlingshire. He married, in 1900, Helen Scott Thyne. They had two sons and one daughter.

Professional career
He was Director of the firm of Messrs. Innes, Henderson and Co, Ltd., hosiery manufacturers of Hawick. He was President of the South of Scotland Chamber of Commerce.

Political career
He was a Justice of the peace for Roxburghshire, a member of the Licensing Appeal Court, and of the National Council of the Y.M.C.A., and for several years he was a member of Hawick Town Council.
He was National Liberal Party (UK) Member of Parliament for Roxburgh and Selkirk from 1922 to 1923. He was first elected in 1922 as a supporter of deposed Coalition Prime Minister David Lloyd George against another Liberal who was a supporter of H. H. Asquith;

In 1923 following reunion between Lloyd George and Asquith, he sought to retain his seat as the Liberal candidate. However, he was now opposed by a Unionist and was defeated;

He was Honorary Sheriff-Substitute for Roxburghshire.

References

External links 
 

1874 births
1951 deaths
Members of the Parliament of the United Kingdom for Scottish constituencies
UK MPs 1922–1923
National Liberal Party (UK, 1922) politicians
Councillors in Scotland
People from Hawick
Knights Bachelor